Thirukkai Vazakkam is a literature sung in praise of the Vellalar / Kaaralar / agriculturist communities of Tamil Nadu by the great Tamil cannon Kambar (poet) in the 12th century A.D. The source of Thirukkai Vazakkam in Tamil is available in this link

References

Tamil poetry
Vellalar